Joan of Scotland may refer to:
Joan of England, Queen Consort of Scotland (1210–1238)
Joan Beaufort, Queen of Scotland (c. 1404–1445)
Joan of Scotland, Countess of Morton (c. 1428–1486)